Consuelo is a novel by George Sand, first published serially in 1842-1843 in La Revue indépendante, a periodical founded in 1841 by Sand, Pierre Leroux and Louis Viardot.  According to The Nuttall Encyclopædia, it is "[Sand's] masterpiece; the impersonation of the triumph of moral purity over manifold temptations."

The character of Consuelo was supposedly modeled after Louis Viardot's wife, the soprano Pauline Viardot. Pauline Viardot was a good friend of both Sand's and of her lover Frédéric Chopin.

First sentence
«Oui, oui, Mesdemoiselles, hochez la tête tant qu'il vous plaira; la plus sage et la meilleure d'entre vous, c'est ... Mais je ne veux pas le dire; car c'est la seule de ma classe qui ait de la modestie, et je craindrais, en la nommant, de lui faire perdre à l'instant même cette rare vertu que je vous souhaite.... » 

"Go on then, young ladies, shake your heads at me, but I'll tell you this... the best behaved and the cleverest girl among you is... — no, I won't tell you who, because she is the only one of my class who has any modesty. I am afraid that if I pointed her out here, she would instantly lose that rare virtue. It is one that I wish the rest of you had more of..." —

Synopsis
Consuelo is a Spanish girl abandoned in Italy whose voice attracts the old maestro Porpora. Through him she is presented to Count Zustiniani. The latter, after her successful début on the stage, falls in love with her, but is repulsed. When her early lover Angoletto forgets her, Consuelo is sent by Porpora to the home of a German family in Bohemia. Her entrance into this household prepares the way for the sequel, La Comtesse de Rudolstadt (1843).

Theme 
Consuelo's adventures continue in La comtesse de Rudolstadt where they take a more philosophical and esoteric dimension. Through all these adventures, Consuelo becomes an untouchable figure of the European artistic landscape of the eighteenth century thanks to the music and the support of her master, the Porpora. The two volumes, Consuelo and La comtesse de Rudolstadt were edited separately but constitute a single work.

Posterity
After the death of George Sand, numerous of her novels disappear into oblivion and her work was quickly reduced to a handful of so-called «country» novels such as La Mare au diable or La Petite Fadette. However, from the 1960s to the 1970s, the rest of Sand's work began to be rediscovered through critical editions, colloquia and scholarly studies. Consuelo is rehabilitated and recognized as one of her masterpieces.

Theatrical treatments
Two operas are based on this novel:
 Consuelo by Alfonso Rendano (1888)
 Consuelo by Giacomo Orefice (1895)

References

External links
 The book on Project Gutenberg in French:
 Consuelo, Tome 1 (1861)
 Consuelo, Tome 2 (1861)
 Consuelo, Tome 3 (1861)
 Consuelo, audio version 
  
 Consuelo at the Open Library. Includes English editions.

1842 French novels
Novels adapted into operas
Novels by George Sand